Central Cole Camp Historic District is a national historic district located at Cole Camp, Benton County, Missouri. The district encompasses 37 contributing buildings in the central business district of Cole Camp.  It developed between about 1881 and 1951, and includes representative examples of period commercial, Romanesque Revival, and Italianate style architecture.  Notable buildings include the Daisy Roller Mill (c. 1888), Citizens Bank (1898), Congregational Church (1913), Kroenke Dort Building (c. 1919), and Cole Camp Mercantile Building (c. 1924).

It was listed on the National Register of Historic Places in 2002.

References

Historic districts on the National Register of Historic Places in Missouri
Romanesque Revival architecture in Missouri
Italianate architecture in Missouri
Buildings and structures in Benton County, Missouri
National Register of Historic Places in Benton County, Missouri